"The Spank" is a song written by James Brown and Charles Sherrell and recorded by Brown. It was released as a single in 1978, backed by Brown's recording of the Elvis Presley song "Love Me Tender". It charted #26 R&B. It also appeared on the 1978 album Jam/1980's. The song is named after a popular dance of the time.

References

James Brown songs
Songs written by James Brown
Songs written by Sweet Charles Sherrell
1978 singles
1978 songs
Polydor Records singles